Wat Samian Nari Station is a railway station in Chatuchak District, Bangkok. It serves the SRT Dark Red Line. It is located in front of Wat Samian Nari temple.

History 
In the past, there used to be a Wat Samian Nari railway halt on the Northern Line and Northeastern Line of the State Railway of Thailand. However it was closed before 2000. A new elevated station was constructed and opened on 2 August 2021 following the opening of the SRT Dark Red Line.

References 

Railway stations in Bangkok
Railway stations in Thailand
Chatuchak district